Trichromia leucostigma is a moth in the subfamily Arctiinae. It was described by Sepp in 1855. It is found in Suriname.

References

Moths described in 1855
leucostigma